In the 1967–68 Football League First Division season Manchester City won the First Division title for the second time in the club's history. They won the title on 11 May, with a 4–3 win at Newcastle United whilst the defending champions and their nearest rivals Manchester United lost 2–1 at home to Sunderland. Fulham were relegated on 1 May, after losing 2–0 at home against Stoke City, who survived on the last weekend of the season on 11 May, with a draw against Leicester City at the expense of Sheffield United, who lost 2–1 at home to Chelsea.

League standings

Results

Team locations

Top scorers

References

RSSSF

Football League First Division seasons
Eng
1967–68 in English football leagues
1967–68 Football League

lt:Anglijos futbolo varžybos 1967–1968 m.
hu:1967–1968-es angol labdarúgó-bajnokság (első osztály)
ru:Футбольная лига Англии 1967-1968